These are the squads for the 2000 CONCACAF Gold Cup.

Group A

Colombia
Head coach:

Honduras
Head coach: Ramón Maradiaga

Jamaica
Head coach:  René Simões

Group B

Haiti
Head coach:  Emmanuel Sanon

Peru
Head coach:  Francisco Maturana

United States
Head coach: Bruce Arena

Group C

Guatemala
Head coach:  Carlos Miloc

Mexico
Head coach: Manuel Lapuente

Trinidad and Tobago
Head coach: Bertille St. Clair

Group D

Canada
Head coach: Holger Osieck

Costa Rica
Head coach: Marvin Rodríguez

South Korea
Head coach: Huh Jung-moo

References
Gold Cup 2000 at RSSSF
https://web.archive.org/web/20000831011530/http://www.concacaf.com/competitions/

CONCACAF Gold Cup squads
2000 CONCACAF Gold Cup